The Sandman is a figure in folklore who brings good sleep and dreams.

Sandman may also refer to:

People
Sandman (surname)
Sandmann, German-language surname
Mariano Rivera (born 1969), Panamanian-American baseball player nicknamed "Sandman"
Adam Sandler (born 1966), American comedian and actor nicknamed "The Sandman" by fans
Howard Sims (1917–2003), African-American tap dancer nicknamed "Sandman"
Steve Abbott (comedian) or The Sandman, Australian comedian
The Sandman (wrestler), a ring name of retired professional wrestler Jim Fullington (born 1963)
Homeboy Sandman, American rapper

Arts, entertainment and media

Audio dramas
The Sandman (Doctor Who audio drama), a 2002 Doctor Who audio drama
The Sandman (Audible audio drama) a 2020 audio drama based on the comic series by Neil Gaiman

Fictional characters
Sandman (DC Comics), the name of many superhero characters published by DC Comics
Sandman (Wesley Dodds), a comic book superhero first appearing in the 1930s
Sandman (Sandy Hawkins), former sidekick of Wesley Dodds and current Sandman
Dream (Sandman), a godlike entity and personification of dreaming. Wesley Dodds is retconned as an avatar of a part of Dream during his imprisonment
Sandman (Dungeons & Dragons), a creature in the Dungeons & Dragons series
Sandman (Marvel Comics), a comic book super villain who can transform his body into sand
Mr. Sandman (Punch-Out!!), a character in the video game Punch-Out!!
Christian "The Sandman" Naylor, a villain in Death Warrant
Klein Sandman, the leader of the protagonists from Gravion
Sandman, a character on Bubba the Love Sponge's radio show
Sandman, a character in Call of Duty: Modern Warfare 3
Sandman, a profession in Logan's Run
Sandman, a character in Rise of the Guardians
Sandman, a character in The Real Ghostbusters episode "Sandman, Dream Me A Dream"
Sandman, a character in The Santa Clause 2
Sandmen, parasites in Dark•Matter for the roleplaying game Alternity
The Sandman, a drug dealer in Scarface: The World Is Yours
The Sandman, a lead character in Sleepstalker
the title character of Nilus the Sandman, a 1990s Canadian animated series

Film and television
 Sandmann – Historien om en sosialistisk supermann (2005), a Norwegian documentary about Sandmännchen, by Jannicke Systad Jacobsen
 The Sandman (1991 film), a short horror stop-motion animation film
 The Sandman (2000 film), a short film by the Brothers Quay
S&Man (2006) or Sandman, an American pseudo-documentary film on horror films
 The Sandman (2011 film), a Swiss romantic comedy
 The Sandman (2017 film), an American horror film
 The Sandman (2022 TV series), an American television series

Literature
The Sandman (book), a children's book by Ralph Fletcher
The Sandman (novel), a novel by Miles Gibson
The Sandman (Vertigo), a comic book series written by Neil Gaiman
"The Sandman" (short story), a short story by E.T.A. Hoffmann

Music

Groups
The Sandmen, a Danish rock band best known from the film Nattevagten

Albums
Sandman (album), a 1976 album by Harry Nilsson

Songs
"Sandmann" (song), a 2009 song by Oomph!
"Sandman" or "Enter Sandman", by Metallica
"Mr. Sandman", written by Pat Ballard, also recorded as "Sandman"
"Sandman", by America from the debut album America
"Sandman", by English band Hurts from the album Exile
"The Sandman", by Heavenly from the 2001 album Sign of the Winner
"Sandman", performed by Kirsty McGee
"Sandman", by Ed Sheeran from the album =
"Sandman", by ASAP Rocky from the album Live. Love. ASAP

Periodicals
Sandman (magazine), a British music magazine

Other uses
Sandman Hotels, a group of Canadian hotels and restaurant companies
Sandman Centre, a multi-purpose arena in Kamloops, British Columbia, Canada
Holden Sandman, a sports package for the 1970s Holden Kingswood and 2015 Commodore

See also
Mr. Sandman (disambiguation)
Sandmännchen, two different German children's bedtime television programs starting in 1958

Lists of people by nickname